Virendra Kumar Tewari (born 1955) is an agricultural engineer, professor and director at IIT Kharagpur.  He is known for his pioneering studies on Farm Machinery & Power. He is an elected fellow of Indian Society of Agricultural Engineers and Institution of Engineers (India)

Awards and honors
Jawahar Lal Nehru Award (1986)
NRDC Republic Day Invention Award (1987)
ISAE R. K. Jain Memorial Award (1994)
ISAE Commendation Medal (1996)
ISAE Fellow Award (2006)

Selected bibliography

Selected patents
Mechanical loading-unloading and uniform spreading system for tea leaf on withering trough
Integrated Composite Anthropometer

Books

Selected articles

References

Living people
1955 births
IIT Kharagpur alumni
Academic staff of IIT Kharagpur
Engineers from West Bengal
Indian Institute of Technology directors